Hansjörg (or Hansjoerg) may refer to:

Hansjörg
Hansjörg Aschenwald (born 1965), Austrian Nordic combined skier
Hansjörg Dittus, German physicist whose fields of expertise are gravitational physics, metrology, inertial sensors
Hansjörg Felmy (1931–2007), German actor
Hansjörg Göritz (born 1959), German architect 
Hansjörg Hirschbühl (born 1937), Swiss bobsledder who competed in the early 1950s
Hansjörg Jäkle (born 1971), German former ski jumper who competed from 1993 to 2002
Hansjörg Knauthe (born 1944), East German former biathlete, who competed at the Olympics
Hansjörg Kunze (born 1959), German track and field athlete
Hansjörg Lunger (born 1964), Italian ski mountaineer
Giovanni Giorgio Moroder, also known as Hansjörg Moroder (born 1940), Italian music producer and DJ, the "Father of Disco"
Hansjörg Pauli (born 1931), Swiss musicologist, writer, and music critic
Hansjörg Raffl (born 1958), Italian luger who competed from the late 1970s to the mid-1990s
Hansjörg Schellenberger, German oboist and conductor born in 1948
Hansjörg Trachsel (born 1948), Swiss politician and former bobsledder who competed in the late 1970s
Hansjörg Vogel (born 1951), Swiss theologian who was the Roman Catholic bishop of the Basel
Hansjörg Walter (born 1951), Swiss politician of the Swiss People's Party
Hansjörg Wyss (born 1935), Swiss billionaire

German masculine given names
Swiss masculine given names